Serra da Boa Vista may refer to:

 Serra da Boa Vista, located in the state of Ceará.
 Serra da Boa Vista, located in the state of Minas Gerais.